Jay Meek (1937 – November 3, 2007 St. Paul) was an American poet, and director of the Creative Writing program at the University of North Dakota.  He was the poetry editor of the North Dakota Quarterly for many years.

He graduated from University of Michigan in 1959, and from Syracuse University with a master's degree in creative writing in 1963.
He taught at Massachusetts Institute of Technology, Sarah Lawrence College, Wake Forest University, Memphis State University, Memorial University of Newfoundland, Colby College (Maine) and Syracuse University.

In 2005, he read his poetry at the Library of Congress.

He married Martha George Meek in 1966; they had a daughter, Anna George Meek, and granddaughter, Sarah Meek.

Awards
1985 Guggenheim Fellowship
two National Endowment for the Arts Grants
Pushcart Prize
Bush Foundation Artist Fellowship.

Works
The week the dirigible came: poems, Carnegie Mellon University Press, 1976, 
Drawing on the walls, Carnegie Mellon University Press, 1980, 
Earthly purposes, Carnegie Mellon University Press, 1984, 
Stations: poems, Carnegie Mellon University Press, 1989, 
Windows, Carnegie Mellon University Press, 1994
Headlands: new and selected poems, Carnegie Mellon University Press, 1997, 
Trains in winter, Carnegie-Mellon University Press, 2004, 
The Memphis letters: a novel, Carnegie Mellon University Press, 2001,

Anthologies
"Sonny Liston", Perfect in their art: poems on boxing from Homer to Ali, Editors Robert Hedin, Michael Waters, SIU Press, 2003, 
"Visiting My Boyhood Friend after His Stroke", Line drives: 100 contemporary baseball poems, Editors Brooke Horvath, Tim Wiles, SIU Press, 2002, 
"The Week the Dirigible Came", The Zeppelin reader: stories, poems, and songs from the age of airships, Editor Robert Hedin, University of Iowa Press, 1998,

References

American male poets
1937 births
2007 deaths
University of North Dakota faculty
University of Michigan alumni
Syracuse University alumni
20th-century American poets
20th-century American male writers